Trujillo's yellow bat or Trujillo's house bat (Scotophilus trujilloi) is a species of vesper bat endemic to Kenya.

Taxonomy and etymology
It was described as a new species in 2014. The holotype was collected in 1985 in Kwale County, Kenya.
The eponym for the species name "trujilloi" is Robert Trujillo. Trujillo's work on the molecular systematics of Scotophilus bats "paved the way" for the description of this species and three others.

Description
Trujillo's house bat has reddish-mahogany fur on its back and grayish-orange fur on its belly.

Range and habitat
Trujillo's house bat is endemic to Kenya, where it is found in the Coast Province.

Conservation
As of 2017, it is evaluated as a least-concern species by the IUCN. Its range includes at least one protected area, the Shimba Hills National Reserve. It is possibly quite tolerant of human-mediated landscape disturbance. It is threatened by the intentional destruction of its roosts.

References

Endemic fauna of Kenya
Bats of Africa
Scotophilus
Mammals described in 2014